Paratepa is a genus of moths belonging to the family Tortricidae.

Species
Paratepa ferruginea Razowski & Becker, 2001

See also
List of Tortricidae genera

References

External links
tortricidae.com

Euliini
Tortricidae genera